Psilops paeminosus is a species of Brazilian gymnophthalmid lizard (spectacled lizards).

References

paeminosus
Reptiles described in 1991
Taxa named by Miguel Trefaut Rodrigues
Taxobox binomials not recognized by IUCN